Jadsom Meemyas de Oliveira da Silva (born 20 May 2001), known as Jadsom, is a Brazilian footballer who plays as a defensive midfielder for Red Bull Bragantino.

Life and career
Born in Recife, Silva started his career at Sport Club do Recife where he made his professional debut on February 3, 2019, in a Campeonato Pernambucano's match against América. On February 21, 2019, Silva moved permanently to Cruzeiro where he debuted in the Série A on July 27, 2019, against Athletico Paranaense.

Career statistics

Club

References

External links
 

2001 births
Living people
Sportspeople from Recife
Brazilian footballers
Association football midfielders
Campeonato Brasileiro Série A players
Campeonato Brasileiro Série B players
Sport Club do Recife players
Cruzeiro Esporte Clube players
Red Bull Bragantino players